Rineloricaria magdalenae is a species of catfish in the family Loricariidae. It is native to South America, where it occurs in the basins of the Sinú River, the Magdalena River, and possibly the Catatumbo River in Colombia and Venezuela. It is typically found in slow-flowing rivers, as well as marshes and swamps. The species reaches 20 cm (7.9 inches) in length and is believed to be a facultative air-breather.

References 

Loricariidae
Freshwater fish of Colombia
Freshwater fish of Venezuela
Fish described in 1879
Taxa named by Franz Steindachner